Ryavnyy ("Zealous") was a Project 1135M Burevestnik-class ("Petrel") Guard Ship (SKR) or 'Krivak II' class frigate that served with the Soviet Navy. Launched on 1 September 1979, the vessel operated as part of the Pacific Fleet as an anti-submarine vessel, with an armament built around the Metel Anti-Ship Complex. Ryavnyy took part in operations in the Indian and Pacific Oceans and undertook visits to countries friendly to the Soviet Union. The ship spent time in the Seychelles and North Yemen in 1982 and North Korea in 1985 and 1986. Taken out of service for an overhaul in 1989, Ryavnyy was instead placed in reserve until 17 July 1997, when the ship was decommissioned and sold to be broken up.

Design and development
Ryavnyy was one of eleven Project 1135M ships launched between 1975 and 1981. Project 1135, the Burevestnik ("Petrel") class, was envisaged by the Soviet Navy as a less expensive complement to the Project 1134A Berkut A (NATO reporting name 'Kresta II') and Project 1134B Berkut B (NATO reporting name 'Kara') classes of anti-submarine ships. Project 1135M was an improvement developed in 1972 with slightly increased displacement and heavier guns compared with the basic 1135. The design, by N. P. Sobolov, combined a powerful missile armament with good seakeeping for a blue water role. The ships were designated Guard Ship (SKR) to reflect the Soviet strategy of creating protected areas for friendly submarines close to the coast and the substantially greater anti-ship capability compared to earlier members of the class. NATO forces called the vessels 'Krivak II' class frigates.

Power was provided by two M7K power sets, each consisting of a combination of a  DK59 and a  M62 gas turbine arranged in a COGAG installation and driving one fixed-pitch propeller. The ship’s complement was 194, including 23 officers.

Armament and sensors
Ryavnyy was designed for anti-submarine warfare around four URPK-5 Rastrub missiles (NATO reporting name SS-N-14 'Silex'), backed up by a pair of quadruple launchers for  torpedoes and a pair of RBU-6000  Smerch-2 anti-submarine rocket launchers. The URPK-5 also had secondary anti-ship capabilities. Defence against aircraft was provided by forty 4K33 OSA-M (SA-N-4 'Gecko') surface to air missiles which were launched from two sets of ZIF-122 launchers, each capable of launching two missiles. Two  AK-100 guns were mounted aft.

The ship had a well-equipped sensor suite, including a single MR-310A Angara-A air/surface search radar, Don navigation radar, the MP-401S Start-S ESM radar system and the Spectrum-F laser warning system. Fire control for the guns consisted of a MR-143 Lev-214 radar. An extensive sonar complex was fitted, including MG-332T Titan-2T, which was mounted in a bow radome, and MG-325 Vega. In addition to the PK-16 decoy-dispenser system, the vessel was equipped with an additional eight-tube decoy system aft specially developed for point-defence against missiles.

Construction and career
Laid down by on 1 March 1978 with the yard number 167 at the Yantar Shipyard in Kaliningrad, Ryavnyy was launched on 1 September 1979. The ship was the antepenultimate of the class built at the yard. The ship was named for a Russian word that can be translated zealous. The vessel was commissioned on 31 December and was initially based at Baltiysk. At the time, the Soviet Union was extending its Asian presence, and expanding the Pacific Fleet with large combat vessels of comparable capability to the European fleets. Therefore Ryavnyy was allocated to the Pacific Fleet and set off from the Baltic Sea.

Ryavnyy operated in the Indian and Pacific Oceans, travelling as far as the Arabian Peninsula. The ship undertook a number of good will visits to countries that were friendly to the Soviet Union. On 8 May 1982, the ship arrived at Victoria, Seychelles, staying for four days. Between 1 and 5 August, the vessel was to be found at Al Hudaydah in what was then North Yemen. Three years later, between 13 and 17 August 1985, Ryavnyy  visited Wonsan in North Korea, returning to the city a year later between 4 and 8 July. Wonson was at the time an increasingly important port for the Soviet Union and visits by naval vessels were crucial to retaining a good relationship between the countries.

However, soon afterwards, Ryavnyy was taken out of service. The ship was handed to Dalzavod in Vladivostok on 1 June 1989 for a medium overhaul, but never returned to active duty. Initially put in reserve, Ryavnyy was decommissioned on 17 July 1997 and sold to be broken up.

References

Citations

Bibliography

 
 
 
 
 
 
 
 
 

1979 ships
Cold War frigates of the Soviet Union
Krivak-class frigates
Ships built at Yantar Shipyard
Ships built in the Soviet Union